Chasing Madoff is a 2010 documentary film written and directed by Jeff Prosserman. The film is based on the book by Harry Markopolos. It was first released at the International Documentary Film Festival in Amsterdam on 19 November 2010. It was first shown in North America on 26 August 2011.

Summary 
The film chronicles how Harry Markopolos and his associates spent ten years trying to get the U.S. Securities and Exchange Commission (SEC) and others to acknowledge and act on their investigative proof of Bernie Madoff's Ponzi scheme, which scammed an estimated $18 billion, or $65 billion including fake returns, from investors. Despite a series of meetings over a number of years, the SEC ignored Markopolos and his associates or only gave the evidence a cursory investigation.

Interviewees 
 Harry Markopolos
 Frank Casey
 Neil Chelo
 Michael Ocrant
 Gaytri Kachroo

Reception 
 On Metacritic, the film has a weighted average score of 52 out of 100, based on 17 critics, indicating "mixed or average reviews". Entertainment Weekly gave the film a B+ rating.

References

External links 
 
 

Films about con artists
Madoff investment scandal
American documentary films
2010 documentary films
2010 films
Documentary films about crime in the United States
Fraud in the United States
2010s English-language films
2010s American films